The following are the football (soccer) events of the year 1947 throughout the world.

Events

Winners club national championship

Argentina
River Plate

Austria
SC Wacker Wien

Chile
Colo-Colo

Costa Rica
C.S. Herediano

England
for fuller coverage see 1946–47 in English football
First Division: Liverpool
Second Division: Manchester City
 Third Division: Doncaster Rovers
Fourth Division: Cardiff City
FA Cup: Charlton Athletic

France  
 CO Roubaix-Tourcoing

Hungary
 Újpest FC

Italy
 Torino

Ireland
Shelbourne

Mexico
Atlante

Netherlands
Ajax Amsterdam

Paraguay
Olimpia Asunción

Romania
Divizia A: ITA Arad
Divizia B: Unirea Tricolor București, Ploiești, Dermata Cluj
Divizia C: Concordia Ploiești, BNR București, Astra Română Câmpina, PCA Constanța, Ripensia Timișoara, Sanitas Satu Mare, CFR Cluj, Șoimii Sibiu,  Doljul Craiova, Aninoasa, Danubiana Roman, Astra Română Moreni

Scotland
for fuller coverage see 1946–47 in Scottish football
League Division A: Rangers
League Division B: Dundee
League Division C: Stirling Albion
Scottish Cup: Aberdeen
Scottish League Cup: Rangers

Spain
Valencia

Sweden
IFK Norrköping

Switzerland
FC Biel-Bienne

Turkey
Ankara Demirspor

Uruguay
Nacional

USSR

First Group: CDKA Moscow
Second Group: Lokomotiv Moscow
Soviet Cup: Spartak Moscow

Yugoslavia
Partizan Beograd

International tournaments
1947 British Home Championship (28 September 1946 – 12 April 1947)

Births
 15 January – Peter Nogly, German international Footballer
 25 January – Tostão, Brazilian international footballer
 20 February – Peter Osgood, English international footballer (died 2006)
 24 February – Fernando Barrachina, Spanish international footballer (died 2016)
 3 March – Óscar Tabárez, Uruguayan football player and manager
 24 March – Archie Gemmill, Scottish international footballer
 3 April – Ladislav Kuna, Slovak football player and manager (died 2012)
 25 April – Johan Cruijff, Dutch international footballer and manager (died 2016)
 8 May – Sef Vergoossen, Dutch football manager
 3 July – Rob Rensenbrink, Dutch international footballer (died 2020)
 10 August – Laurent Pokou, Ivorian international footballer (died 2016)
 28 August – Emlyn Hughes, English international footballer (died 2004)
 15 October – Laszlo Fazekas, Hungarian international footballer
 23 October – Kazimierz Deyna, Polish international footballer (died 1989)
 2 November – Allan Michaelsen, Danish international footballer (died 2016)
 26 December – Dominique Baratelli, French international footballer

Deaths
 8 May – Attilio Ferraris, Italian midfielder, winner of the 1934 FIFA World Cup. (43, heart attack during a friendly match between former stars in Montecatini Terme)
 12 June – Cosme Damião, Portuguese football player and manager, 61

References

 
Association football by year